Arixiuna prolixa is a species of beetle in the family Cerambycidae. It was described by Bates in 1872. It is known from Costa Rica, Mexico, Nicaragua and Panama.

References

Hemilophini
Beetles described in 1872